Big Brother Greece 7 is the seventh season of the Greek reality television series Big Brother. The show began airing on 29 August 2021 on Skai TV. It is the second season of Big Brother to air on Skai TV. The show also simulcast live in Cyprus on Sigma TV like in the last season.

The couple Grigoris Gountaras and Natali Kakava are the two new hosts of the show, replacing Harry Varthakouris. Afroditi Grammeli is the new opinionist, replacing Andreas Mikroutsikos. The winner will receive €100,000.

Housemates
On the first day, fourteen housemates entered the house.

Nominations table

Notes

Ratings
Official ratings are taken from AGB Hellas.

References

External links
 Official website on skaitv.gr

2021 Greek television seasons
07